Soledad Unified School District (SUSD) is a school district headquartered in Soledad, California.

In 2020 superintendent Tim Vanoli announced that he was retiring.

As of 2021 the district is planning establishing housing for teachers, with an outside management company managing the facility.

Schools
 Secondary schools
 Soledad High School
 Main Street Middle School

 Elementary schools
 Rose Ferrero Elementary School
 Jack Franscioni Elementary School
 Gabilan Elementary School
 Frank Ledesma Elementary School
 San Vicente Elementary School

 Other
 Community Education Center

References

External links
 Soledad Unified School District
School districts in California
School districts in Monterey County, California